In the National Football League (NFL), eight quarterbacks share the record of having thrown seven touchdown passes in a single game. Sid Luckman was the first player to accomplish the feat, doing so on November 14, 1943, while playing for the Chicago Bears. The most recent seven-touchdown game occurred on November 1, 2015, when Drew Brees did so with the New Orleans Saints. During that game the two teams' quarterbacks combined for 13 passing touchdowns, setting another NFL record. Four quarterbacks on the list are in the Pro Football Hall of Fame: Luckman, George Blanda, Y. A. Tittle, and Peyton Manning. There was a 44-year gap between seven-touchdown games from Joe Kapp's in 1969 until 2013, when Peyton Manning and Nick Foles each did so just two months apart. Manning also holds the NFL record for touchdown passes in a season, with 55.

See also
 List of National Football League season passing touchdowns leaders
 List of National Football League passing touchdowns leaders
 List of NFL quarterbacks who have posted a perfect passer rating
 List of NFL quarterbacks who have passed for 500 or more yards in a game
 List of Major League Baseball hitters with four home runs in a game

References
General
 
 
 

Footnotes

Touchdowns
National Football League records and achievements
National Football League lists